Elachista cordata is a moth of the family Elachistidae that is found in Cameroon.

The forewing ground colour is white, the base of the costa and the dorsum with a narrow irregular dark brown blotch, sometimes tinged with ochreous. The hindwings are brownish grey. Adults have been recorded in early May.

Etymology
The species name is derived from the Latin cordatus (meaning heart shaped) and refers to the shape of the gnathos.

References

cordata
Moths described in 2011
Endemic fauna of Cameroon
Moths of Africa
Insects of Cameroon